Otto of Burgundy (944 – 22 February 965) was Duke of Burgundy from 956 to his death. 

Otto was a son of Hugh the Great, duke of the Franks, and his wife Hedwig of Saxony, a sister of Otto I, Holy Roman Emperor. He was a brother of King Hugh Capet of France.

He became duke through his wife Liutgarde, daughter of Gilbert, who held most of the counties of Burgundy. He had no known descendants.

His brother, Henry I, Duke of Burgundy, succeeded him as Duke of Burgundy.

See also
Dukes of Burgundy family tree

References

944 births
965 deaths
Dukes of Burgundy
10th-century rulers in Europe